The Redstone River is a large river in the Northwest Territories of Canada. Draining a rugged and high area of the Mackenzie Mountains, the Redstone watershed is sparsely populated by people but remains an ecological haven for wildlife including moose, caribou, wolves Dall's Sheep and Bears. It is a pristine mountain wilderness.

Course
The river initially flows northwest, turning west where the Moose Horn River enters from the left. It makes a bend to the north, turning south near Wrigley Lake, and receives its larger tributary, the Ravens Throat River, as it cuts through the Redstone Range.

Watershed
Its tributary, the Ravensthroat River, has the distinction of being significantly larger than the Redstone at their confluence. Older maps referred to these rivers as the North and South Redstone respectively.

Recreation
Recently, both the Redstone and Ravensthroat Rivers have proven to be challenging and rewarding multiday canoe/rafting expeditions, with many class 2 and 3 rapids and canyons in a remote montane wilderness setting. The first modern descent of the Redstone was in the year 2000 via the Raven's Throat tributary by a National Geographic Explorers League group.  Outfitters from the NWT and BC have since run guided trips down the rivers flying with a float plane into either Wrigley Lake for the Redstone or Divide Lake for the Raven's Throat (helicopter support required). The river and its tributaries offers a different experience compared to the other Mackenzie Mountain rivers as it cuts through a unique geological area known as the Redstone Plateau. Trips usually last between 10–16 days long depending on the route, and finish in the communities of Tulita or Norman Wells on the Mackenzie River.

See also
List of rivers of the Northwest Territories

References

Rivers of the Northwest Territories
Tributaries of the Mackenzie River